Macgregor Fullarton MacIntosh (born August 25, 1896) was a Canadian politician. He served in the Legislative Assembly of British Columbia from 1937 to 1941, as a Conservative member for the constituency of The Islands.

Electoral history

|Co-operative Commonwealth Fed.
|Grace E. Burtt Martin 
|align="right"|414
|align="right"|19.60%
|align="right"|
|align="right"|unknown

|Liberal
|Alexander McDonald
|align="right"|694
|align="right"|32.86%
|align="right"|
|align="right"|unknown
|- bgcolor="white"
!align="right" colspan=3|Total valid votes
!align="right"|2,112
!align="right"|100.00%
!align="right"|
|- bgcolor="white"
!align="right" colspan=3|Total rejected ballots
!align="right"|21
!align="right"|
!align="right"|
|- bgcolor="white"
!align="right" colspan=3|Turnout
!align="right"|%
!align="right"|
!align="right"|
|}

He fought in WW1 and WW2.
In 1941, the area was redistributed into the new Nanaimo and the Islands riding.  Parts of it are now in Saanich North and the Islands.
Macgregor Fullarton MacIntosh died in 1958.

References

British Columbia Conservative Party MLAs
1896 births
Year of death missing
Politicians from Glasgow
Scottish emigrants to Canada
British emigrants to Canada